Chile at the 1920 Summer Olympics in Antwerp, Belgium was the nation's third appearance out of six editions of the Summer Olympic Games.

Athletics

The best result for the team was MacKey's 16th-place finish in the javelin qualifying events. 

Ranks given are within the heat.

References

 
 

Nations at the 1920 Summer Olympics
1920
Olympics